Fedora is a 1913 Italian silent film directed by Achille Consalvi and starring Claudia Zambuto.

Cast
 Claudia Zambuto as Fedora  
 Gero Zambuto 
 Frederico Elvezi 
 Giuseppe De Witten 
 Cesare Amerio 
 Signor Cappello 
 Achille Consalvi

References

Bibliography
 Abel, Richard. Encyclopedia of Early Cinema. Taylor & Francis, 2005.

External links

1913 films
1910s Italian-language films
Films directed by Achille Consalvi
Italian silent feature films
Italian black-and-white films